The mining sector in Chile is one of the pillars of Chilean economy and copper exports alone stands for more than one third of government income. Most mining in Chile is concentrated to the Norte Grande region spanning most of the Atacama Desert. Mining products of Chile includes copper, gold, silver, molybdenum, iron and coal. Chile was, in 2019, the world's largest producer of copper, iodine and rhenium, the second largest producer of lithium and molybdenum, the sixth largest producer of silver, the seventh largest producer of salt, the eighth largest producer of potash, the thirteenth producer of sulfur and the thirteenth producer of iron ore in the world. In the production of gold, between 2006 and 2017, the country produced annual quantities ranging from 35.9 tons in 2017 to 51.3 tons in 2013.

Nitrate
Mining nitrate in the North of Chile defined the country's history from the late 19th century to the mid 20th. Indeed the period 1873-1914 is referred to as the Saltpetre Republic.

Copper

Although the relative importance of copper declined in the 1970s and 1980s, it was still the Chilean economy's most important product in 1992. The mining sector represented 6.7 percent of GDP in 1992, as compared with 8.9 percent in 1985. In 1991, copper exports represented 30 percent of the total value of exports, a substantial decline with respect to the 1960s, when it represented almost 80 percent of total exports. Mining exports in general accounted for about 48 percent of total exports in 1991.

Two developments in the copper sector were noteworthy. First, in the 1987-91 period, there was a substantial increase in the output of refined copper, as well as a relative decline in the production of blister copper. Second, the state-owned Copper Corporation (Corporación del Cobre—Codelco), the world's largest copper producer, still had an overwhelmingly dominant role (accounting for 60 percent of Chile's copper output in 1991).

The so-called Codelco Law of April 1992 authorized Codelco for the first time to form joint ventures with the private sector to work unexploited deposits. Thus, in a major step for Codelco, in 1995, it invited domestic and foreign mining firms to participate in four joint explorations in northern Chile. Foreign owned private firms were to become increasingly important as new investment projects got underway.

The heightened importance of these foreign private firms in large-scale copper mining also resulted from the international business community's improved perception of Chile and from a mining law enacted during the Pinochet regime that clearly established compensation rules in the case of nationalization and otherwise encouraged investment in this sector.

Given this more favourable context, Phelps Dodge, a United States mining company and the Sumitomo Metal Mining Company, a Japanese firm, signed a US$1.5 billion contract in 1992 with the Chilean government to develop Candelaria, a copper and gold mine south of Copiapó. The mine's potential production of refined copper was equivalent to about 10 percent of Codelco's entire production.

Copper Stabilization Fund
Despite the decline in copper's importance, Chile continued to be affected by the vagaries of the international copper market. The fund received 0.2-0.5% of GDP, depending on the size of the budget surplus each year. In 2006, a one-off sum of $600 million United States dollars was added to the fund. The fund was replaced with the Economic and Social Stabilization Fund in 2007. The new fund received fiscal surpluses in excess of 1% of GDP. The high variability of copper prices affected the Chilean economy, particularly the external accounts and the availability of foreign exchange, in several ways. In the 1987-91 period, the international copper market was very favorable; for example, copper prices in 1989 were 50 percent higher than in 1980. By May 1992, however, the price of copper had declined to about its 1980 level.

The government decided to counteract the effect of the variability of copper prices by creating the Copper Stabilization Fund, which worked as follows: whenever the price of copper increased, the government would direct a proportion of the increased revenues into the fund; these resources would then be used during those years when the price of copper fell below its "normal" level. This institutional development helped Chile at least partially free itself from the volatility of the copper market. The Copper Stabilization Fund is occasionally tapped into if there is a major need for more money. Part of the fund will be used to help pay for reconstruction after the devastating 2010 Chile earthquake.

Lithium

Northern Chile forms part of the Lithium Triangle with substantial reserves in the form of brine. The explosive growth in electric vehicles since 2015 has triggered increased demand.  Chile's SQM is a world leader in lithium production.

Chile is the main producer of lithium from brine. Most of Chile's lithium reserves are in Salar de Atacama and Salar de Maricunga.

Other minerals

Since the late 1970s, the production of gold and silver has increased greatly. The lead, iron and petroleum industries have shrunk since the mid-1970s, the result of both adverse international market conditions and declines in the availability of some of these resources. With a combined total value of about US$4 billion, two of the largest investments planned in Chile in the early 1990s were designated for aluminium-smelter projects in the Puerto Aisén and Strait of Magellan areas.

SQM is also a significant iodine producer.

Almost no mining of placer gold occurs today.

See also
Geology of Chile
Law on Mining Concessions
 Nitratine or Chile saltpeter, the naturally occurring form of sodium nitrate
 List of Saltpeter works in Tarapacá and Antofagasta

References

External links

 
 Chile's mining industry, Amcham Chile in 2006